Elections to Lewisham London Borough Council were held in May 1986.  The whole council was up for election. Turnout was 40.7%.

Election result

|}

Ward results

References

1986
1986 London Borough council elections